CAA Tournament may refer to the championship of any sport sponsored by the Colonial Athletic Association, including the following:
Colonial Athletic Association men's basketball tournament
Colonial Athletic Association baseball tournament
Colonial Athletic Association women's basketball tournament